The 1942–43 Cornell Big Red men's ice hockey season was the 36th season of play for the program. The teams was coached by Nick Bawlf in his 21st season.

Season
As they had done over the previous four seasons, the Big Red played in the Lake Placid Invitational Tournament early in the year. Due to the United States entry in World War II over a year earlier, several schools suspended their ice hockey programs beginning with this season. As a result, the normally 8-team bracket was replaced by a 6-team round robin. Cornell won its first two games and had a chance to lay claim to the championship, however, they were soundly beaten by Hamilton in their third match and had to settle for 3rd place. After returning from the winter break two main factor limited the team to just a single game for the remainder of the season: a lack of ice and a dearth of opponents. Cornell's only match after the tournament was against Army and the big Red were solidly defeated.

Roster

Standings

Schedule and results

|-
!colspan=12 style=";"| 

|-
!colspan=12 style=";" | Regular Season

References

Cornell Big Red men's ice hockey seasons
Cornell
Cornell
Cornell
Cornell